Maribellus sediminis is a Gram-negative, facultatively anaerobic, nitrogen-fixing and straight rod-shaped bacterium from the genus of Maribellus.

References

Bacteroidia
Bacteria described in 2020